Pyotr Fyodorovich Anjou (15 February 1796 – 12 October 1869) was an Arctic explorer and an admiral of the Imperial Russian Navy.

Background
Anjou's grandfather was a French Huguenot who entered the service of Russia in the middle of the 18th century. His father became a Russian citizen and worked as a doctor. Anjou was born in Vyshny Volochyok, near Tver. He graduated from the Marine Cadet Corps. 

As a lieutenant, Anjou was given a task to describe the northern coast of Siberia in 1820. He and his assistants (P.Ilyin, I. Berezhnykh, and A. Figurin) described the coastline and the islands between the rivers Olenyok and Indigirka and made a map of the New Siberian Islands.

In 1825–1826, Anjou participated in describing the northeastern coast of the Caspian Sea and the western coast of the Aral Sea. He distinguished himself in the Battle of Navarino as a lieutenant of the line of battle ship "Gangut".

Later on, he held a few commanding posts and also served in administrative and scientific establishments of the Russian Admiralty. One of the groups of the New Siberian Islands bears Anjou's name (the Anjou Islands).

References

1796 births
1869 deaths
People from Vyshny Volochyok
Russian and Soviet polar explorers
Explorers from the Russian Empire
Imperial Russian Navy admirals
Explorers of the Arctic
New Siberian Islands
Russian people of French descent
19th-century explorers
Russian people of the Greek War of Independence
Russian nobility
Naval Cadet Corps alumni